The September 2022 Donetsk attack was the shelling of civilian infrastructure facilities on the Baku Commissars Square in Donetsk, as a result of which, according to official data, 13 people were killed.

Nine 150 mm shells were used, targetting Kuibishevsky District of Donetsk from a village west to the city.

Course of events 
Since the start of the war in Donbass in 2014, the Ukrainian city of Donetsk has been controlled by the forces of the self-proclaimed Donetsk People's Republic, which claims control over the entire territory of the Donetsk region.

Victims 
According to Alexey Kulemzin, 13 people became victims of the shelling, including two children. The number of wounded remains unknown. There were no official comments from the Ukrainian side about the shelling.

See also 

 March 2022 Donetsk attack
 Maisky Market attack

References 

September 2022 events in Ukraine
September 2022 crimes in Europe
Mass murder in 2022
Airstrikes during the 2022 Russian invasion of Ukraine
War crimes during the 2022 Russian invasion of Ukraine
21st-century mass murder in Ukraine
2022 controversies
History of Donetsk
War crimes in Ukraine